Judson Freeman Ayers Jr. (March 17, 1933 – November 9, 2013) was an American politician. He served as a member of the South Carolina House of Representatives.

Life and career 
Ayers attended Greenwood High School, the University of South Carolina and the University of Virginia School of Law.

In 1965, Ayers was elected to the South Carolina House of Representatives, representing Greenwood County, South Carolina.

Ayers died in November 2013, at the age of 80.

References 

1933 births
2013 deaths
Members of the South Carolina House of Representatives
20th-century American politicians
University of South Carolina alumni
University of Virginia School of Law alumni